Kenizzite (also spelled Cenezite in the Douay–Rheims Bible) was an Edomitish tribe referred to in the covenant God made with Abraham.

In  Jephunneh, father of the Israelite leader Caleb, is called a Kenizzite.

Hebrew Bible nations
Edom
Book of Genesis